Bulldozer was a monster truck designed by Guy Wood. It featured one of the first 3-D body shells, with horns sticking out of the roof. The truck debuted in 1997 as a promotional truck for Smoke Craft jerky in the USA Motorsports series (since acquired by Monster Jam, who now own the rights to the design). The truck has been driven by Bobby Zoelner, Steve Reynolds, Rob Knell, former Taurus driver Eldon DePew, and current Maximum Destruction superstar Tom Meents, as well as Chuck Werner and Alex Blackwell. The truck El Toro Loco was created as a spin-off of the Bulldozer design.

World Finals Appearances
Bulldozer has appeared in four Monster Jam World Finals. In 2001, the truck was driven by Eldon DePew. In 2000, 2002, and 2004, the truck was driven by Guy Wood.

Final appearance
The truck performed its last show in Englishtown, New Jersey, at Old Bridge Township Raceway Park on September 19, 2009. After that show, the truck was converted into an El Toro Loco, with the same driver as before, Chuck Werner.

See also
 List of monster trucks

References
 

Monster trucks
Off-road vehicles
Sports entertainment
Vehicles introduced in 1997